The Beat is the 14th studio album by Boney James released on April 9, 2013. At the 56th Annual Grammy Awards (held on January 26, 2014), The Beat lost out to Steppin' Out performed by Herb Alpert in the Best Pop Instrumental Album category.

Track listing

 "Don't You Worry 'Bout a Thing" (Stevie Wonder) - 4:56
 "Sunset Boulevard" (Boney James, Brandon Coleman) - 4:07
 "Missing You" (James, Abi Mancha, Jairus Mozee) - 3:37 
 "Batucada (The Beat)" (Marcos Valle, Paulo Sérgio Valle) - 4:03: featuring Rick Braun
 "Maker of Love" (James, Phil Davis, Raheem Devaughn) - 3:48: featuring Raheem Devaughn
 "Mari's Song" (James) - 4:28
 "Powerhouse" (James, Mark Stephens) - 4:00
 "The Midas (This Is Why)" (James, Natalie Stewart, Nolan Weekes) - 4:03: featuring The Floacist
 "Acalento (Lullaby)" (James, Stephens) - 4:04
 "You Can Count on Me" (James) - 4:57

Personnel 
 Boney James – keyboards, alto saxophone, soprano saxophone, tenor saxophone, flute
 Brandon Coleman – keyboards (1, 2)
 Jairus Mozee – keyboards (3), programming (3), guitars (3)
 Tim Carmon – keyboards (4), keyboard bass (4), acoustic piano (6, 8)
 Phil Davis – keyboards (5), programming (5)
 Mark Stephens – keyboards (7, 9)
 Rob Bacon – guitars (2, 4, 7, 10)
 Dwayne "Smitty" Smith – bass (2, 10)
 Alex Al – bass (4, 6, 7, 9)
 Vinnie Colaiuta – drums (1, 9, 10)
 Omari Williams – drums (2, 4, 7)
 Lenny Castro – percussion 
 Rick Braun – trumpet (4)
 Abi Mancha – vocals (3)
 Raheem Devaughn – vocals (5)
 The Floacist – vocals (8)

Production 
 Boney James – producer, recording
 Dave Rideau – recording, mixing 
 Jamil "Face" Johnson – vocal recording (5)
 Nolan Weekes – vocal recording (8)
 Graham Hope – assistant engineer 
 David Schwerkolt – assistant engineer
 Paul Blakemore – mastering 
 Lexy Shroyer – production coordinator 
 Gravillis, Inc. – package design 
 Harper Smith – photography 
 Barbara Rose Management – management 

Studios
 Recorded at The Backyard (Los Angeles, California) and Sunset Sound (Hollywood, California).
 Vocals on Track 5 recorded at Phase Recording & Media (White Plains, Maryland).
 Vocals on Track 8 recorded at Free Sum Music Studio (London, UK).
 Mixed at Cane River Studios (Sherman Oaks, California).
 Mastered at CMG Mastering (Cleveland, Ohio).

Awards

Notes
Track 1 is a cover a song by Stevie Wonder from his 1973 album Innervisions.

References

2013 albums
Boney James albums
Concord Records albums